Vitex altissima, the peacock chaste tree, is a species of woody plant reaching some 20 m in height, in the family Lamiaceae. It is native to the Indomalayan realm, namely Bangladesh, India, Indonesia, Myanmar, and Sri Lanka, and is also found in New Guinea. Its greyish bark becomes scaly with maturity. The leaves are trifoliolate or palmate, compound and opposite. They are elliptic or elliptic-lanceolate in shape with acuminate apex and cuneate base. The margin is serrate or sometimes entire. The inflorescences are in terminal panicles. The corolla is bluish white. The purplish black fruit is a four-seeded drupe.

Common names
Tamil – Mayilei, Mayilainochi, Mayiladi
Malayalam – Myila, Mylellu
Marathi – Dhavi-rivthi, Balage
Telugu – Ganduparu, Nemiliadogu
Kannada – Myrole, Nevaladi, Navuladi, Balgay
Sinhala – Milla (මිල්ල) 
English – Peacock chaste tree, Tall chaste tree
Assamese – Ahoi (অহোঈ )
Sanskrit – Atulam (अतुलम्), Tilakam (तिलकम्)
Nepali – Tin-patte

References

altissima
Flora of tropical Asia